Systematic Protein Investigative Research Environment (SPIRE) provides web-based experiment-specific mass spectrometry (MS) proteomics analysis in order to identify proteins and peptides, and label-free expression and relative expression analyses. SPIRE provides a web-interface and generates results in both interactive and simple data formats.

Methodology
Spire's analyses are based on an experimental design that generates false discovery rates and local false discovery rates (FDR, LFDR) and integrates open-source search and data analysis methods. By combining X! Tandem, OMSSA and SpectraST SPIRE can produce an increase in protein IDs (50-90%) over current combinations of scoring and single search engines while also providing accurate multi-faceted error estimation. SPIRE combines its analysis results with data on protein function, pathways and protein expression from model organisms.

Integration with other information
SPIRE also connects results to publicly available proteomics data through its Multi-Omics Profiling Expression Database (MOPED). SPIRE can provide analysis and annotation for user-supplied protein ID and expression data. Users can upload data (standardized appropriately) or mail in data files.

References

Further reading 

 
 

Mass spectrometry software
Proteomics
Biological databases